is a Japanese visual novel developed by Circus that was released for Windows on May 31, 2019, and was released for the Nintendo Switch and PlayStation 4 on December 19, 2019. It has a spin-off, Da Capo 4 Fortunate Departures, which was released for Windows on February 26, 2021 and was released for the Nintendo Switch and PlayStation 4 on October 27, 2022. Both game has its adult version, named Da Capo 4 Plus Harmony and Da Capo 4 Sweet Harmony respectively, released for Windows on August 27, 2021 and April 28, 2022. D.C.4 is the fourth main installment in the Da Capo series, after Da Capo, Da Capo II and Da Capo III. The game was first announced on September 23, 2018, and takes place in a different setting to its predecessors: Kagami Island. The story is told from the perspective of the protagonist Ichito Tokisaka and the narrative focuses on his relationship with the seven main heroines. The gameplay is mostly reading text and dialogue between the characters and making decisions which can alter the story route that the player takes.

Gameplay
Da Capo 4 is a romance visual novel in which the player assumes the role of Ichito Tokisaka. The gameplay requires little interaction from the player, as most of the duration of the game is spent simply reading the text that appears on the screen which represents either dialogue between the various characters or the inner thoughts of the protagonist. The text is accompanied by character sprites, which represent who Kanata is talking to, over background art. Throughout the game, the player encounters CG artwork at certain points in the story, which take the place of the background art and character sprites. Every so often, the player will come to a point where he or she is given the chance to choose from multiple options. Gameplay pauses at these points and depending on which choice the player makes, the plot will progress in a specific direction. To experience all of Da Capo 4'''s plot lines, the player will have to replay the game multiple times and make different decisions to progress the plot in an alternate direction.

Synopsis

Unlike its predecessors in the Da Capo series which take place on Hatsune Island, Da Capo 4 is set on  where "cherry blossoms float in the sky". However, the story takes place in winter so the cherry blossoms are replaced with snow. Ichito Tokisaka, the protagonist, has a magical power to see floating mirrors around the island that reflect smiles. He aims to become a true magician in the future. Ichito attends the high school , as do his love interests.

The Da Capo 4 love interests are Arisu Sagisawa, the main heroine and a popular and outgoing student at the high school who frequently has to turn down confessions; Nino Tokisaka, Ichito's younger sister-in-law and an honor student who loves cats despite her cat allergy and has a devilish personality; Sorane Ōmi, Ichito and Nino's childhood friend and next-door neighbour who likes to cook and acts like an older sister to them; Hiyori Shirakawa, a beautiful troublemaker in Ichito's class who assumes the role of love contractor with a high success rate; Shīna Hōjō, a quiet but sharp-tongued girl who likes games and often comes across as difficult to approach; Miu Mishima, the president of the discipline committee who has a timid disposition and always has to scold Hiyori; finally, Chiyoko Hinohara, an eccentric and happy-go-lucky girl who records herself in live broadcasts using the stagename Choco.

Development and releaseDa Capo 4 was announced on September 23, 2018 as Circus' 20th project and the official website opened on November 11, 2018. Similarly to Da Capo III, no adult scenes were created for Da Capo 4 so the game is rated for all-ages. The character designers for the game were Natsuki Tanihara, Yuki Takano, Mamu Mitsumoto, Yū Kisaragi and Shayuri. Tanihara designed the characters Arisu, Sorane, Chiyoko, KotoRI and Alice; Nino and Hiyori's designs were drawn by Takano; Mitsumomo drew the character design for Shīna;  marking both their first work on a visual novel, Kisaragi designed Miu, while Shayuri designed Ichito and supporting characters. Six writers were appointed to the game scenario: Hasama, Nakamichi Sagara, Shingo Hifumi, Kei Hozumi, Izumi Yūnagi and Hakumai Manpukutei.

A limited edition of Da Capo 4 was released for Windows PCs on May 31, 2019. A port for the Nintendo Switch and PlayStation 4 will be released on December 19, 2019.

Music
The opening theme for Da Capo 4 is  sung by Rin'ca. The intermediate route opening theme  is also sung by Rin'ca. Yozuca sings , the grand theme song of Da Capo 4''.

References

External links
Official website 

2019 video games
 
Visual novels
Windows games
Windows-only games
Japan-exclusive video games
Video games developed in Japan